The 1990 Tour du Haut Var was the 22nd edition of the Tour du Haut Var cycle race and was held on 24 February 1990. The race started in Sainte-Maxime and finished in Seillans. The race was won by Luc Leblanc.

General classification

References

1990
1990 in road cycling
1990 in French sport